Fedder is a surname. Notable people with the surname include:

Jan Fedder (1955–2019), German actor
Judith Fedder (born 1958), United States Air Force general
Steen Fedder (born 1951), Danish chess master

See also
Tedder
Vedder